The AAM Tower (also known as Arenco Tower) is a 46-floor office tower in Dubai Media City in Dubai, United Arab Emirates. The building was designed by Arenco Architectural & Engineering Consultants. It was also developed by Al Nekhreh Contracting Co. LLC. The construction of the building started in 2005. It was completed in 2008.

Events 
In February 2017, one of the building tenants Exential Commercial Brokers, under investigation for fraud, had its offices broken into, raising fears of evidence tampering in the case.

See also 
 List of tallest buildings in Dubai
 List of tallest buildings in the United Arab Emirates

References

External links

Office buildings completed in 2008
Skyscraper office buildings in Dubai